The 1911 VMI Keydets football team represented the Virginia Military Institute (VMI) in their 21st season of organized football. First-year head coach Alpha Brumage lead the 7–1 Keydets to their most wins in school history.

Schedule

References

VMI
VMI Keydets football seasons
VMI Keydets football